Zimní stadion Havířov is a multi-use indoor sporting arena located in Havířov, Czech Republic. The capacity of the arena is 5,100 people, all places are seated. The arena was constructed in 1950. It is currently home to the AZ Havířov ice hockey team.

Indoor ice hockey venues in the Czech Republic
Buildings and structures in Havířov
Sports venues in the Moravian-Silesian Region
1968 establishments in Czechoslovakia
Sports venues completed in 1968
20th-century architecture in the Czech Republic